There have been two major accidents at Norton Fitzwarren in Somerset:
The 1890 Norton Fitzwarren rail crash
The 1940 Norton Fitzwarren rail crash